Arthur Joachim von Oettingen ( – 5 September 1920) was a Baltic German physicist and music theorist. He was the brother of theologian Alexander von Oettingen (1827–1905) and ophthalmologist Georg von Oettingen (1824–1916).

Biography 
He studied astronomy and physics at the University of Dorpat, and furthered his education of physics in Paris in the laboratories of Antoine César Becquerel (1788–1878) and Henri Victor Régnault (1810–1878), and afterwards at Berlin in the laboratories of Heinrich Gustav Magnus (1802–1870), Johann Christian Poggendorff (1796–1877) and Heinrich Wilhelm Dove (1803–1879).

In 1868 he became a professor at Dorpat, where he founded a meteorological observatory. In 1893 he moved to the University of Leipzig, where he remained until 1919 as a teacher and honorary professor. In 1898 and 1904 he published the third and fourth volumes of Poggendorff's Biographisch-Literarisches Handwörterbuch der exakten Naturwissenschaften.

Oettingen was a primary advocate of a theory of acoustical relationships known as "harmonic dualism". This concept was later expanded and elaborated on by musicologist Hugo Riemann (1849–1919). Oettingen is also credited for introducing a measurement of musical interval known as the millioctave. He later created a musical instrument, the Orthotonophonium - a pump organ using 72 notes per octave, to further advocate harmonic dualism.

Selected works 
 Harmoniesystem in dualer Entwicklung, Dorpat 1866.
 Meteorologische Beobachtungen angestellt in Dorpat im Jahre ..., Dorpat 1868–1877. 
 Über den mathematischen Unterricht in der Schule, Dorpat 1873.
 Elemente des geometrisch-perspektivischen Zeichnens, Leipzig 1901.

See also
 List of Baltic German scientists

References 

 This article is based on a translation of an equivalent article at the German Wikipedia.

External links
 Chemistry Tree: Arthur Joachim von Oettingen Details
 Stamps, Tartu University Meteorology Observatory 150 / 614-02.12.15, On 2 December 1865 Arthur von Oettingen launched meteorological observations at the Tartu University Physics Cabinet.
 02.12.2015 – Tartu University Meteorology Observatory 150, On 2 December 1865 Arthur von Oettingen launched meteorological observations at the Tartu University Physics Cabinet.

1836 births
1919 deaths
People from Jõgeva Parish
People from Kreis Dorpat
Arthur
Baltic-German people
19th-century German physicists
German music theorists
University of Tartu alumni
Academic staff of the University of Tartu
Academic staff of Leipzig University